The 1924 United States presidential election in New York took place on November 4, 1924. All contemporary 48 states were part of the 1924 United States presidential election. Voters chose 45 electors to the Electoral College, which selected the president and vice president.

New York was won by incumbent Republican President Calvin Coolidge of Massachusetts, who was running against Democratic Ambassador John W. Davis of West Virginia and the Progressive Party's Senator Robert M. La Follette of Wisconsin. Coolidge’s running mate was former Budget Director Charles G. Dawes of Illinois and Davis ran with Governor Charles W. Bryan of Nebraska, while La Follette ran with Senator Burton K. Wheeler of Montana.

In a three-way race, Coolidge won with a decisive majority of 55.76% of the vote to Davis’ 29.13% and La Follette’s 14.55%, a victory margin of 26.63%. In the midst of a nationwide Republican landslide, New York’s results in this election made the state about 2% more Republican than the national average. Robert La Follette’s Progressive support was strongest in the New York City area, where he took double-digit support, and even broke 20% in the boroughs of Brooklyn and the Bronx. La Follette also broke 20% in upstate Monroe County, home to the city of Rochester. La Follette got the majority of his votes in New York state under the Socialist label (268,518 votes) than under the Progressive label (206,395 votes), for a combined total of 474,913 votes.

Coolidge got 1,820,058 votes in the state of New York, swept every county in the state, winning every upstate county as well as sweeping all 5 boroughs of New York City, the last time a Republican presidential candidate has done so.

The 1920s were a fiercely Republican decade in American politics, and New York during the Fourth Party System was a Republican-leaning state in presidential elections. The economic boom and social good feelings of the Roaring Twenties under popular Republican leadership virtually guaranteed Calvin Coolidge an easy win in the state against the conservative Southern Democrat John Davis, who had little appeal in Northern states like New York where large Catholic populations opposed his reticence on the anti-Catholic Ku Klux Klan. Coolidge won a strong majority statewide even with the Republican vote being split by the strong third party candidacy of Robert La Follette, a Republican Senator who had run as the Progressive Party candidate and peeled away the votes of many progressive Republicans.

Nevertheless, Coolidge won all five boroughs of New York City, and thus won the city as a whole with a plurality of the vote. Coolidge won with pluralities of the vote in Manhattan, Brooklyn, the Bronx, and Staten Island, and took an absolute majority of the vote in Queens. From his time as governor of neighboring Massachusetts, Coolidge remained, for a Republican, relatively popular with Irish Catholic and other ethnic immigrant communities, helping him to hold on to New York City. Many of these voters would defect to the Democrats for Catholic New Yorker Al Smith in 1928 and become reliable Democratic voters after that. As a result, 1924 remains the last U.S. presidential election in which a Republican has won the boroughs of Manhattan, Brooklyn, or the Bronx, the last time that a Republican presidential candidate has won New York City as a whole, and the second and final time that a Republican presidential candidate won every county in New York state.

Combined with decisive Republican majorities in every county in upstate New York and in Long Island, Coolidge easily dominated New York State’s election returns in 1924. No Republican since has been able to outperform Coolidge’s county-level performance or surpass his statewide margin of victory; the only stronger Republican win in New York’s history was when Coolidge was running for Vice President four years earlier in Warren G. Harding’s massive landslide of 1920. Calvin Coolidge is one of only three presidential candidates of either party who has been able to sweep every county in New York State, the others being Republican Warren G. Harding in 1920 and Democrat Lyndon Johnson in 1964.

Results

Results by county

See also
 United States presidential elections in New York
 Presidency of Calvin Coolidge

Notes

References

New York
1924
1924 New York (state) elections